A flour tortilla or wheat tortilla is a type of soft, thin flatbread made from finely ground wheat flour.  It was originally inspired by the corn tortilla of Mexican cuisine, a flatbread of maize which predates the arrival of Europeans to the Americas. Made with a flour- and water-based dough, it is pressed and cooked, similar to corn tortillas. The simplest recipes use only flour, water, fat, and salt, but commercially-made flour tortillas generally contain chemical leavening agents such as baking powder, and other ingredients.

History 
The flour tortilla is a variant of the corn tortilla. The word tortilla comes from Spanish meaning "small cake". The oldest found tortillas date back as far as 10,000 years BCE and were made of native maize with dried kernels. The corn tortilla was the principal food of the Aztecs and other Mesoamerican civilizations. The flour tortilla is a much more recent invention.

It is said by some that flour tortillas originated in the northern Mexican states of Chihuahua, Durango, Sonora and Sinaloa, where the territory is more suited to growing wheat than corn. In recent times, they have become integral to Mexican American (most notably in the form of a burrito), Mexican—and Tex-Mex—cuisine. Mexican Americans talk about the flour tortilla having come from the wheat-filled plenty of the United States. Most often it is attributed to Alta California when California was still part of the Mexican Republic. Most specifically, it is credited to regions of Northern & Central California with the first mass-produced flour tortillas having come from flour tortilla factories in metropolitan Los Angeles. Some have even attributed the origin of flour tortillas to Jewish immigrants of the United States.

Etymology 
Tortilla, from Spanish torta, cake, plus the diminutive -illa, literally means "little cake". 

Tortilla in Iberian Spanish also means omelette. As such, this wheat flour flatbread tortilla is not to be confused with the Spanish omelette or any other egg based one.

Production 

Wheat tortillas are a staple of the northern Mexican states (such as Sonora, Sinaloa and Chihuahua) and throughout the Southwestern United States.

Tortillas vary in size from about 6 to over 30 cm (2.4 to over 12 in), depending on the region of the country and the dish for which it is intended.

Industrially-produced tortillas typically contain numerous chemicals in order to ease the production process, control texture and flavor, and to extend shelf life. Work has been done at Washington State University to develop methods for producing tortillas on a mass scale while still using only whole-wheat flour, water, oil, and salt, with a fermented flour-and-water sourdough starter replacing chemical leaveners.

Tortillas today 

Today, personal and industrial (Mexican-style) tortilla-making equipment has facilitated and expedited tortilla making. Manually operated wooden tortilla presses of the past led to today's industrial tortilla machinery, which can produce up to 60,000 tortillas per hour. Tortillas are now not only made from maize meal, but also from wheat flour; home-made and store-bought tortillas are made in many flavors and varieties.

Tortillas remain a staple food in Mexico and Central America, and have gained popularity and market share elsewhere. In the U.S., tortillas have grown from an "ethnic" to a mainstream food. They have surpassed bagels and muffins, and have now become the number two packaged bread product sold in the U.S (behind sliced bread). The Tortilla Industry Association (TIA) estimates that in the U.S. alone, the tortilla industry (tortillas and their products – tortilla chips, tostada shells and taco shells) has become a US$6 billion a year industry.

Nutritional information 
Soft wheat tortillas use wheat instead of masa as the primary ingredient. The Mission Foods brand lists the following ingredients: enriched bleached wheat flour (wheat flour, niacin, reduced iron, thiamine mononitrate, riboflavin, folic acid), water, vegetable shortening (interesterified soybean oil, hydrogenated soybean oil and/or palm oil), contains 2% or less of: salt, sugar, leavening (sodium bicarbonate, sodium aluminum sulfate, corn starch, monocalcium phosphate and/or sodium acid pyrophosphate, calcium sulfate), distilled monoglycerides, enzymes, wheat starch, calcium carbonate, antioxidants (tocopherols, ascorbic acid, citric acid), cellulose gum, guar gum, dough conditioner (fumaric acid, sodium metabisulfite and/or mono- and diglycerides), calcium propionate and sorbic acid (to preserve freshness).

The recipe recommended by American chef and restaurateur Rick Bayless who specializes in traditional Mexican cuisine uses just four ingredients: flour, lard, salt, and water. 

The nutritional info for the Mission brand 49 g wheat tortilla is:
 total fat: 3.5 g (saturated 3.5 g, monounsaturated 1 g) - 5% daily allowance
 sodium: 420 mg - 18% daily allowance
 total carbohydrate: 24 g - 8% daily allowance
 dietary fiber: 1 g - 4% daily allowance
 protein: 4 g
 calcium: 8% daily allowance
 iron: 8% daily allowance

Consumption 
Wheat flour tortillas have been used on many American spaceflights since 1985 as an easy solution to the problems of handling food in microgravity and preventing bread crumbs from escaping into delicate instruments.

Mexico 
The word "tortilla" in these countries is used to refer to the ubiquitous corn tortilla, made of maize. In Mexico burritos are made with wheat tortillas. Flour tortillas were also very popular in Tex-Mex food and plates like fajitas. Flour tortilla with beans and eggs was very popular in northern Mexico and in the Southwest. The origin of the flour tortilla was northern Mexico and this is why so many plates are made with it like quesadillas as well as burritos, chimichangas and fajitas served with flour tortilla and bean taco or chorizo taco. The flour tortilla is the sister to the corn tortilla which was created first. From Mexico City southward the corn tortilla is more popular but in northern Mexico, where it originated, the flour tortilla may be as popular, if not more popular, than the corn tortilla.

Flour tortillas are commonly filled with meat, chopped potatoes, refried beans, cheese, hot sauce and other ingredients to make dishes such as tacos, quesadillas and burritos (a dish originating in the Ciudad Juarez, Chihuahua, Mexico/El Paso, Texas area).

United States, U.S. territories and Northern Mexico 
In Northern Mexico and much of the United States, "tortillas" mean wheat-flour tortillas. They are the foundation of Mexican border cooking. Their popularity was driven by the low cost of inferior grades of wheat flour provided to border markets and by their ability to keep and ship well.

Tortilla art is the use of tortillas as a substrate for painting. Tortillas are baked and then covered in acrylic before they are painted.

Central America 

Tortillas in Central America sometimes differ somewhat from their Mexican counterparts, although are made similarly. In Guatemala and El Salvador, the tortillas are about 5 millimeters thick and about 10 centimeters in diameter, thicker than Mexican tortillas, but similar in size to Mexican gorditas. Like the Mexican tortillas, the maize is soaked in a mixture of water and lime (or lye), then rinsed and ground. In El Salvador, they sometimes use sorghum (called maicillo there) to make tortillas when there is not enough maize. Also in El Salvador, there is a particularly large and thick tortilla called a "chenga" on top of which food is placed, like an edible plate, to serve food to the labourers in coffee plantations and farms.

Honduras is well known for using wheat flour tortillas to make baleadas, which consist of a wheat flour tortilla, folded in half, with various items (beans, cream, scrambled eggs) put inside.

Maize and wheat tortillas can often be found in supermarkets in El Salvador and Costa Rica produced by Mexican companies.

Stuffed tortillas known as pupusas are also a famous dish of traditional Salvadoran cuisine.

United States 
Tortillas are widely used in the United States, in recipes of Mexican origin and many others. As a testament to their popularity, the Tortilla Industry Association (TIA) estimated Americans consumed approximately 85 billion tortillas in 2000 (not including tortilla chips).  They are more popular than all other ethnic breads such as English muffins, pita bread, and bagels.

Tortilla chips –made from maize tortillas cut into wedges, then fried – first gained popularity in the 1940s in Los Angeles, California, and were mass-produced there. The ingredients in maize tortillas are maize, lime, and water. Fried chips add salt and vegetable oil.

Flour tortillas are commonly used in burritos.  They are also used to make fajitas, wraps, sandwiches, quesadillas, casseroles and stews, and there are numerous other uses.

Many people from both Northern Mexico and throughout the Southwestern United States eat tortillas as a staple food. Many restaurants use wheat flour tortillas in a variety of non-Mexican and Mexican recipes. Many grocery stores sell ready-made tortillas.

See also 

 Arepa, a ground maize dough from Colombia and Venezuela
 Focaccia, a flat oven-baked bread from Italy
 Chapati, an unleavened flatbread from the Indian subcontinent
 Injera, a sourdough-risen flatbread from East Africa
 Khachapuri, a breaded cheese dish from Georgia 
 Khubz, a round bread from the Middle East 
 Matnakash, a leavened bread from Armenia 
 Piadina, a thin, flatbread from Northern Italy
 Pită de Pecica, a round bread from Romania
 Rghaif, a pancake-like bread from Northwest Africa

References

External links 
 
 
 
 
 

Mexican cuisine
Honduran cuisine
Salvadoran cuisine
Belizean cuisine
Appetizers
Flatbreads
Staple foods
Tortilla
Wheat dishes
American breads